is a Japanese politician of the Liberal Democratic Party (LDP) and a member of the lower house representing the Minami Kanto Bloc.

Personal life 
Amari is a native of Atsugi, Kanagawa, where he attended Kanagawa Prefectural Atsugi High School. He graduated from Keio University in 1972 with a degree in political science. After spending two years working at Sony, he left to work as a secretary for his father, Tadashi Amari, who at the time represented Kanagawa's 3rd district in the House of Representatives. He is a follower of Tenrikyo, joining the likes of fellow LDP representatives Hakuo Yanagisawa, Fumio Kyuma, Sanae Takaichi, Bunmei Ibuki, and Jinen Nagase.

Career 
He is a member of the Japan–Korea Parliamentarians' Union and the Japan-China Friendship Parliamentarians' Union.

He was the Minister of Economy, Trade and Industry from 2006 to 2008. He also served as Minister of State in charge of Administrative Reform in the Cabinet of former Prime Minister Tarō Asō.

In the Cabinet of Prime Minister Taro Aso, appointed on 24 September 2008, Amari was appointed as Minister of State in charge of Administrative Reform.

On December 26, 2012, Amari was appointed to the newly created cabinet-level position of Minister of State for Economic Revitalization in the second Cabinet of Prime Minister Shinzo Abe.  Amari's responsibilities within the Abe government also include tax and social security reform. Like Abe and most members of the Cabinet, he is affiliated to the openly revisionist organization Nippon Kaigi.

In 2016, Amari resigned from his Cabinet post amidst allegations of bribery, and was succeeded by Nobuteru Ishihara.

In late September 2021, newly-elected Prime Minister Fumio Kishida appointed Amari to succeed Toshihiro Nikai as the Secretary General of the LDP. In an upset, Amari lost his seat representing Kanagawa's 13th district to Constitutional Democratic Party opponent Hideshi Futori during the 2021 Japanese general elections, but retained his seat in the lower house as representative of the Southern Kanto proportional representation block. Nevertheless, Amari resigned from his position as the party's Secretary General, and Kishida appointed Toshimitsu Motegi to be his replacement.

References

External links 
  

Members of the House of Representatives (Japan)
Ministers of Agriculture, Forestry and Fisheries of Japan
Ministers of Labour of Japan
Tenrikyo
Sony people
Keio University alumni
People from Atsugi, Kanagawa
Politicians from Kanagawa Prefecture
Living people
1948 births
Liberal Democratic Party (Japan) politicians
Members of Nippon Kaigi
21st-century Japanese politicians
Government ministers of Japan